Ryan Ward (born September 26, 1980) is a former lacrosse player in the National Lacrosse League. Ward played 11 seasons in the NLL with the Philadelphia Wings, Minnesota Swarm, and Edmonton Rush. He retired after the 2014 season.

Ward is a two-time Mann Cup winner (in 2003 and 2005) with the Victoria Shamrocks of the Western Lacrosse Association. In 2003, he was awarded the Western Lacrosse Association MVP award. Ward was also a junior high Physical Education teacher in Owatonna, Minnesota. He is also the founder of Twin Cities Lacrosse; a lacrosse club based in the southwest metro area of Minnesota.

Beginning and overview
Ward has been playing lacrosse since the age of three. For the last 25 years, he has played in top indoor and outdoor leagues across North America. He has spent most of his free time coaching youth lacrosse camps and clinics throughout the Twin Cities. Ward currently resides in Chanhassen, Minnesota. He is also the Varsity Head Coach of the Eden Prairie High School lacrosse team.

College career
Ward is a graduate of Butler University. As a senior, he was named Team Captain, and still holds the school record for assists.

Professional career
Ward was selected by the Rochester Rattlers of Major League Lacrosse as a first-round selection (2nd overall) in the 2004 MLL Collegiate Draft. He played one season in the league.

The Philadelphia Wings drafted Ward in the first round (3rd overall) in the 2003 NLL Entry Draft.  As a rookie, he was awarded Rookie of the Week honors in week 8 of the season and named to the 2004 NLL All-Rookie Team. During the 2005 NLL season, Ward was traded to the Minnesota Swarm. In the 2006 NLL season, he was awarded Offensive Player of the Week honors in week 12 for his ten-point game against the Portland LumberJax, and helped lead the Swarm to their first playoff appearance.  In 2007, he was elected to his first National Lacrosse League All-Star Game and again helped lead his team back to the playoffs. In 2008, Ward was again named to the All-Star team, replacing the injured Casey Powell.

Statistics

NLL

External links
 Twin Cities Lacrosse

References

1980 births
Living people
Canadian lacrosse players
Butler Bulldogs men's lacrosse players
Edmonton Rush players
Lacrosse people from British Columbia
Major League Lacrosse players
Minnesota Swarm players
National Lacrosse League All-Stars
Philadelphia Wings players
Sportspeople from Victoria, British Columbia